is a Japanese judoka.

He won a bronze medal in the half-middleweight division in 1996 Asian Judo Championships.

References 

Living people
Japanese male judoka
Year of birth missing (living people)
20th-century Japanese people